The 2012–13 Men's FIH Hockey World League Round 2 was held from February to June 2013. A total of 24 teams competing in 4 events were part in this round of the tournament playing for 7 berths in the Semifinals, played from June to July 2013.

Qualification
8 teams ranked between 9th and 16th in the FIH World Rankings current at the time of seeking entries for the competition qualified automatically, but Malaysia was chosen to host a Semifinal. The Czech Republic was invited to take their place. Also, as Azerbaijan withdrew from participating, Oman took their place in the tournament. Additionally 13 teams qualified from Round 1 and three nations that did not meet ranking criteria and were exempt from Round 1 to host Round 2 tournaments. The following 24 teams, shown with final pre-tournament rankings, competed in this round of the tournament.

New Delhi
New Delhi, India, 18–24 February 2013.

Pool

 Advanced to Semifinals

Rio de Janeiro
Rio de Janeiro, Brazil, 27 February–5 March 2013.

Pool

 Advanced to Semifinals

Saint-Germain-en-Laye
Saint-Germain-en-Laye, France, 6–12 May 2013.

Pool

 Advanced to Semifinals

Awards
Player of the Tournament:  Tom Boon
Goalkeeper of the Tournament:  Martin Zylbermann
Top Goalscorer:  Tom Boon 15 goals
Fair Play:

Elektrostal
Elektrostal, Russia, 27 May–2 June 2013.

Pool

 Advanced to Semifinals

References

External links
Official website (New Delhi)
Official website (Rio de Janeiro)
Official website (St. Germain)
Official website (Eletrostal)

Round 2
International field hockey competitions hosted by France
International field hockey competitions hosted by Brazil
International field hockey competitions hosted by India
International field hockey competitions hosted by Russia